Dalton Parry "Conky" Conyngham (10 May 1897 – 7 July 1979) was a South African cricketer who played in one Test match in 1923. He was born and also died in Durban, Natal.

A right-arm medium-pace bowler, Conyngham took 40 wickets in six matches for the successful Natal side in 1921–22, including his best figures of 5 for 20 against Griqualand West. However, he then played only spasmodically over the next few seasons, dropping out of the side after 1924–25. He played a few matches from 1926 for Transvaal, one of them in Rhodesia where he made his highest first-class score, and had two further games for Western Province in 1930–31.

In his one Test in the final match of 1922–23 series against the England team under Frank Mann, he scored an unbeaten 3 in each innings and took one wicket in each England innings.

He also played for South Africa in two of the matches against S. B. Joel's XI in 1924–25 but without success. In the two matches Natal played against S. B. Joel's XI earlier in the tour he had taken five wickets in an innings three times, with match figures of 10 for 150 in the second match.

References

External links
 
 

1897 births
1979 deaths
South African cricketers
South Africa Test cricketers
KwaZulu-Natal cricketers
Gauteng cricketers
Western Province cricketers
South African people of British descent